The National Commission for Human Development (NCHD) was established in 2002 under Cabinet Division but was later transferred to Ministry of Federal Education and Professional Training under 18th Amendment.

References

External links
 NCHD official website

Pakistan federal departments and agencies
Educational organisations based in Pakistan
Medical and health organisations based in Pakistan
2002 establishments in Pakistan
Government agencies established in 2002